The 2015–16 Penn State Nittany Lions basketball team represented Pennsylvania State University in the 2015–16 NCAA Division I men's basketball season. Head coach Pat Chambers coached his fifth season with the team. They played its home games in University Park, Pennsylvania at the Bryce Jordan Center, with two games at Rec Hall, and were members of the Big Ten Conference. They finished the season 16–16, 7–11 in Big Ten play to finish in tenth place. They lost to Ohio State in the second round of the Big Ten tournament.

Previous season
The Nittany Lions finished the 2014–15 season with an overall record of 18–16, with a record of 4–14 in the Big Ten regular season to finish in 13th place. They advanced to the quarterfinals of the Big Ten tournament where they lost to Purdue.

Departures

Incoming transfers

Under NCAA transfer rules, Samuel will have to sit out for the 2015–16 season. Samuel will have three years of remaining eligibility entering the 2016–17 season.

Incoming recruits

2016 Recruiting Class

Personnel

Roster

Coaching Staff

Schedule and results

|-
!colspan=9 style=|  Non-conference regular season

|-
!colspan=9 style=|Big Ten regular season

|-
!colspan=9 style=| Big Ten tournament

Source -

See also
2015–16 Penn State Lady Lions basketball team

References

Penn State Nittany Lions basketball seasons
Penn State